Ruiwa is an administrative ward in the Mbarali district of the Mbeya Region of Tanzania. In 2016 the Tanzania National Bureau of Statistics report there were 17,487 people in the ward, from 15,867 in 2012.

Villages and hamlets 
The ward has 6 villages, and 47 hamlets.

 Ijumbi
 Ilanji
 Ishungu
 Kilabuni
 Majoja
 Mashala
 Mbalino
 Mbugani
 Mbuyuni
 Mwambalisi
 Malamba
 CCM
 Kalumbulo
 Magombole
 Majengo
 Mtakuja
 Muungano
 Soweto
 Wigoma
 Zingatia
 Motomoto
 Iyawaya
 Misufuni
 Motomoto 'A'
 Motomoto 'B'
 Mwambalizi 'C'
 Ndola
 Tambukareli
 Tingatinga
 Ruiwa
 Funika
 Kibaoni
 Mamfwila 'A'
 Mtengashari
 Mwambalisi
 Rejesta
 Udindilwa
 Kalabure
 Komole
 Maji ya moto
 Mapogoro
 Mbugani
 Mwanjelwa
 Wimba Mahango
 Dodoma 'A'
 Dodoma 'B'
 Ilanji 'A'
 Ilanji 'B'
 Ilolo
 Kaninjowo 'A'
 Kaninjowo 'B'
 Wimba 'A'
 Wimba 'B'

References 

Wards of Mbeya Region